The American Film Manufacturing Company, also known as Flying “A” Studios, was an American motion picture production company. In 1915, the formal name was changed to the American Film Company.

History

The American Film Manufacturing Company was founded in Chicago in the fall of 1910 by Samuel S. Hutchinson, John Freuler, Charles J. Hite and Harry Aitken, four Midwestern businessmen who joined forces and capital to create the company.

Flying "A" Studios was located in La Mesa, California, from August 12, 1911, to July 6, 1912, using filming locations in La Mesa and other East County areas such as Lakeside, in addition to sites around San Diego.

Under the leadership of Allan Dwan, Flying "A" made over 150 films in San Diego County. The films were usually western adventures, comedies or an occasional local documentary. The Flying A westerns were popular with the public and kept Dwan and his crew extremely busy. The Dwan westerns gave the Flying A the ability to mount large advertising campaigns, create additional films, and become a player in the motion picture industry. While mostly filming in the backcountry near La Mesa, some sets were built behind the Flying A Studios. Dwan would occasionally film a cowboy chase scene and then build a plot around that chase. Dwan's troupe of actors became very popular with the public.

In August 1912, Flying "A" Studios established its western branch in Santa Barbara. Prior to this, three shooting companies were created. Two would work at the studio or surrounding locales of Chicago, while it was the third unit that was sent out to concentrate on westerns. This western unit would move through the southwest with stops in New Mexico, Arizona and finally California.

The third unit would eventually settle in the town of La Mesa before moving Northwest to Santa Barbara. California was chosen for its sunny weather, and to avoid the constraints of the "Edison Trust" (i.e., The Motion Picture Patents Company or MPPC) operating in Chicago and New York.

The main reason for choosing Santa Barbara before La Mesa was that the American Film Company wanted to have urban backdrops in some of its movies. During its operation between 1912 and 1917, Flying "A" Studios was one of the largest motion picture studios in the United States. At the time, this made Santa Barbara a filmmaking center rivaled only by Hollywood.

Contract players and directors
When the American Film Company was formed in 1910, it culled many performers, directors, scenario writers and crew members from Essanay Studios the Motion Picture Patents Company. Among the directors and writers that worked for American were Frank Beal, Allan Dwan, J. Warren Kerrigan, and Tom Ricketts. In 1913, Wallace Reid directed several society dramas for the company.

The company's roster of actors included Dot Farley, Margarita Fischer, Mary Miles Minter and William Russell.

Demise
In mid-1918, American Film Company lost its primary distributor when Mutual Film folded. The company signed with a new distributor, Pathé, and continued to produce features. Over the next three years, the company's output decreased significantly. In 1921, one of American's most prominent contract players, Margarita Fischer, left the company. American Film Company was dissolved shortly thereafter.

Gallery

Bibliography
Birchard, Robert S. Silent-era filmmaking in Santa Barbara, Charleston, SC: Arcadia, c2007. .
 
Lyons, Timothy J. The silent partner: the history of the American Film Manufacturing Company, 1910-1921, New York: Arno Press, 1974 [c1972]. .
Slide, Anthony. The American Film Industry: A Historical Dictionary. New York: Limelight Editions, 1990. p. 17. .
Tompkins, Walker A. Santa Barbara History Makers.  McNally & Loftin, Santa Barbara.  1983.  .

References

External links

The Flying A: Silent Film In Santa Barbara

Mass media companies established in 1910
Mass media companies disestablished in 1921
American film studios
Companies based in Chicago
Defunct American film studios
Film production companies of the United States
Film studios in Southern California
American companies established in 1910
1910 establishments in Illinois
1921 disestablishments in Illinois